Joël Sarlot (5 July 1946 – 10 December 2017) was a French politician and veterinarian.

Born on 5 July 1946 in Belfort, Sarlot trained as a veterinarian, and later moved to Nalliers, Vendée. He was a member of the Union for French Democracy and later joined the Movement for France. Sarlot was first elected to the Vendée General Council in 1985 and served until 2015. In 1993, he was seated in the National Assembly for the first time. Sarlot was reelected in 1997, and 2002. However, his 2007 electoral win was invalidated by the Constitutional Council. Additionally, Sarlot served as president of the Pays-de-l'Hermenault federation (Communauté de communes) from its establishment in 1996 to its merger with Pays de Fontenay in 2016. He actively promoted tourism in Vendée, leading the department's tourism committee until 2013. Sarlot resigned as deputy mayor of Saint-Laurent-de-la-Salle in 2017. He died on 10 December 2017, aged 71.

References

1946 births
2017 deaths
Politicians from Belfort
Union for French Democracy politicians
Movement for France politicians
Deputies of the 10th National Assembly of the French Fifth Republic
Deputies of the 11th National Assembly of the French Fifth Republic
Deputies of the 12th National Assembly of the French Fifth Republic
Deputies of the 13th National Assembly of the French Fifth Republic
French veterinarians